Hugh Sproat (born 16 November 1952) is a Scottish footballer, who played as a goalkeeper.

Sproat joined Ayr United from Auchinleck Talbot in 1974. He became a fans favourite and was voted the club's all-time cult hero by Football Focus viewers in 2005. He moved onto Motherwell in 1979 before returning to Ayr in 1984 before retiring from the game in 1986, aged 34.

External links

All-Time Cult Heroes (BBC)
Players of interest – Hugh Sproat

1952 births
Living people
Footballers from Ayr
Scottish footballers
Scottish Football League players
Association football goalkeepers
Ayr United F.C. players
Motherwell F.C. players
Auchinleck Talbot F.C. players